Communication Arts Guild or CAG is an organisation dedicated to the Indian advertising industry. Located in Mumbai, this is the only organisation which has the complete record of the growth of Indian Advertising since Independence.

History
CAG was founded in 1948. It created its own Constitution, in 1950, registered under the Indian Societies Registration Act XXI of 1860. The vision was to create a networking platform within the fraternity of Visual Communication Industry.

Cag awards
CAG distributes a number of awards, including: the Cub Trophies for communication arts and design students; scholarships for pre-final year Art students; the Guru of the Year award; and the CAG Hall of Fame. Hall of Fame members include:
1980–1981 – P.N.Sharma, S.Das Gupta and Umesh Rao
1981–1982 – Waghulkar
1982–1983 – Kishore Parekh and Victor Fernandes
1983–1984 – Mitter Bedi and Hasan Taj
1984–1985 – Nagendra Parmar and R.R.Prabhu
1985–1986 – Kersy Katrak
1986–1987 – Frank Simoes
1987–1988 – Alyque Padamsee
1988–1989 – Arun Kolatkar
1989–1990 – R K Joshi
1990–1991 – Vilas Bhende
1991–1992 – Sylvester DaCunha
1992–1993 – Ivan Arthur
1993–1994 – Brendan Pereira
1994–1995 – Mohammad Khan
1995–1996 – Ravi Paranjpe 
1996–1997 – Ram Mohan
1997–1998 – Avinash Godbole
1998–1999 – Ravi Gupta
1999–2000 – Gerson da Cunha
2000–2001 – Sudarshan Dheer 
2001–2002 – S.A.Sabir
2002–2003 – Panna Jain
2003–2004 – Arun Kale
2004–2005 – Samir Khanzode
2005–2006 – Kamlesh Pandey
2006–2007 – Viru Hiremath
2007–2008 – Piyush Pandey
2008–2009 – Sheila Syed
2009–2010 – Bhai Patki
2010–2011 – Roby D'Silva
2011–2012 – Sagar Gadve

Cag Shield Cricket Tournament
The Cag Shield is a cordial play of short matches between different agencies within the advertising fraternity. Cag developed a connection with individual designers by the awards and workshops or seminars but they wanted to grow bigger. To get agencies' interaction, with each other and Cag, they started this sporty tradition and is continuing even today. This brings the agencies to interact and open up to each other in a group activity apart from advertising.

Cag Annuals
First published in 1950, Cag Annuals were design magazines published yearly. They showcased advertising works in that particular year and also mentioned the Cag winners, Hall of Fame and Young Cags of that year. They also had the photographic record of the events in that year, especially the award show.

References
Cag Winner – Amar Deb (Channel V)
Cag Award in 1993 & 1998 – Achyut Palav
commercial&sort=alpha,desc Cag award winner – Vishal Solanki
Cag designer of the year 1998 – Ram Sinam
Cag Award Winner – International Gallerie, the magazine
Larry Grant cofounded T&PD Committee at AAAI with late Govind Sajnani of Cag
ART00001.html Yearly Participation in Cag Awards
Cag Award Night

External links
Official Website – CAG

Indian design